John James McKechnie was a Scottish professional footballer who played as a full back in the Football League for Clapton Orient, Exeter City, Crewe Alexandra, Northampton Town and Stockport County.

Personal life 
McKechnie served as a corporal in the Royal Horse Artillery during the First World War.

Career statistics

References 

English Football League players
Place of death missing
Newcastle United F.C. players
Year of death missing
Association football fullbacks
British Army personnel of World War I
Scottish footballers
Year of birth missing
Footballers from Inverness
Royal Horse Artillery soldiers
Northampton Town F.C. players
Exeter City F.C. players
Stockport County F.C. players
Leyton Orient F.C. players
Crewe Alexandra F.C. players
Dundalk F.C. players
League of Ireland players
Scottish military personnel